was a Japanese samurai clan that claimed descent from the Seiwa Genji by way of the Kawachi Genji. It was a branch of the Minamoto clan by the Ashikaga clan.

Origins

Ashikaga Kuniuji, grandson of Ashikaga Yoshiuji, established himself in the 13th century at Imagawa (Mikawa Province) and took its name.

Imagawa Norikuni (1295–1384) received from his cousin the shōgun Ashikaga Takauji the province of Tōtōmi, and later that of Suruga.

Located at
Ounami no Kori, Mikawa (modern day Nishio, Aichi) mainly Suruga Province and Tōtōmi Province during the Warring States period

Crests
Two hikiryou
Yoshimoto's version of the akaitori (pictured) 
Two hikiryou and a paulownia planted in white soil

Major figures
Imagawa Sadayo
Imagawa Yoshitada
Imagawa Ujichika
Imagawa Ujiteru
Imagawa Yoshimoto
Imagawa Ujizane

Muromachi era
Imagawa Sadayo, was a renowned Japanese poet and military commander who served as tandai ("constable") of Kyūshū under the Ashikaga bakufu from 1371 to 1395.

Sengoku era
After the death of Yoshimoto at the Battle of Okehazama in 1560, during the Sengoku period, many Imagawa officers defected to other clans. Within a decade, the clan had lost all of its land holdings to the Tokugawa and Takeda clans. The Imagawa subsequently became masters of ceremonies in the service of the Tokugawa clan.

Clan castles
Separated by province name.
 
 Suruga Province: Imagawa Kan (later known as Sunpu Castle), Shizuhatayama Castle, Mochifune Castle, Tanaka Castle
 Tōtōmi Province: Kakegawa Castle, Takatenjin Castle (ja), Futamada Castle, Inui Castle, Hamamatsu Castle, Utsuyama Castle.
 Mikawa Province: Yoshida Castle, Tahara Castle, Okazaki Castle, Anshō Castle
 Owari Province: Katsukake Castle, Ōtaka Castle, Narumi Castle

Edo period
Shinagawa Takahisa, the son of Imagawa Ujizane. He was a hatamoto and served the Tokugawa clan.
Imagawa Norinobu, an Imagawa of the late Edo period, was a wakadoshiyori in the Tokugawa administration.

Key genealogies

Suruga

Imagawa Kuniuji (1243–1282)
Imagawa Morouji (1261–1323)
Imagawa Norikuni (1295?-1384)
Imagawa Noriuji (1316–1365)
Imagawa Yasunori (1334?-1409?)
Imagawa Norimasa (1364–1433)
Imagawa Noritada (1408-1461?)
Imagawa Yoshitada 
Imagawa Ujichika 
Imagawa Ujiteru 
Imagawa Yoshimoto 
Imagawa Ujizane
Imagawa Naofusa (1594–1662)
Imagawa Ujinari (1642–1673)
Imagawa Ujimichi (1668–1699)
Imagawa Noritaka (1694–1712)
Imagawa Norinushi (1698–1728)
Imagawa Norihiko (1716–1749)
Imagawa Noriyasu (1731–1784)
Imagawa Yoshiaki (1756–1818)
Imagawa Yoshimochi (1786–1839)
Imagawa Yoshiyori (1810–1841)
Imagawa Norinobu
Imagawa Yoshihito (1854-1872)

Tōtōmi

Imagawa Sadayo (1326-1420?)
Imagawa Nakaaki
Imagawa Sadaomi
Imagawa Sadasuke
Imagawa Norimasa (?-1464)

Imagawa Sadanobu (?-1474)

Tōtōmi (Horikoshi branch)

Horikoshi Sadamoto (?-1537)
Horikoshi Ujinobu
Horikoshi Sadatada
Horikoshi Sadahisa
Horikoshi Sadayoshi

Horikoshi Sadatsugu

Tōtōmi (Sena branch)

Sena Kazuhide
Sena Ujisada
Sena Ujitoshi
Sena Ujiakira
Sena Masakatsu

Sena Kiyosada

Notable members 
 Jukei-ni
 Lady Tsukiyama
 Lady Hayakawa

Notable retainers

Matsudaira Motoyasu
Toyotomi Hideyoshi
Okabe Motonobu
Matsui Munenobu
Udono Nagateru
Asahina Yasutomo
Ii Naomori
Abe Motozane
Ichinomiya Munekore
Ii Naochika
Ii Naotora
Iio Tsuratatsu
Otazu no kata
Katsurayama Ujimoto
Taigen Sessai
Iio Noritsura
Itami Yasunao
Yamaguchi Noritsugu
Yamaguchi Noriyoshi
Yokoe Magohachi
Fuji Nobutada

Popular culture
Imagawa is a playable nation in Europa Universalis IV.

Notes

References
 "Suruga Imagawa-shi" on Harimaya.com (12 July 2008)

 
Japanese clans
Ashikaga clan